Bayramören is a small town in Çankırı Province in the Central Anatolia region of Turkey. It is the seat of Bayramören District. Its population is 476 (2021).

References

External links
 Municipality's official website 

Populated places in Çankırı Province
Bayramören District
Towns in Turkey